Jeffrey Patrick Murray (March 17, 1960 – August 3, 2015) was an American fantasy artist and author best known for his illustrations of works by J.R.R. Tolkien and C.S. Lewis. His paintings, illustrations, stories, poems, and essays appear regularly in Tolkien and Inklings-oriented  
publications (Amon Hen, Mallorn, and Silver Leaves) and in Catholic publications (St. Austin Review and the Georgia Bulletin) worldwide. He was Artist-in-Residence for the St. Austin Review, and was artist guest of honor at the 2006 Gathering of the Fellowship in Toronto along with Ted Nasmith. He was nominated for an Imperishable Flame award in 
2006, and his work has been exhibited in the USA, Canada, the UK, and the Netherlands.

Bibliography

See also
Works inspired by J. R. R. Tolkien

References

External links

Jef Murray's official web site

American illustrators
Fantasy artists
Tolkien fandom
Tolkien artists
2015 deaths
1960 births